Liana Ferri was an Italian screenwriter, script supervisor and occasional film actress.

Selected filmography
 Women Without Names (1950)
 The Ungrateful Heart (1951)
 The Seven Deadly Sins (1952)
 The Blind Woman of Sorrento (1952)
 Immortal Melodies (1952)
 The Machine That Kills Bad People (1952)
 Villa Borghese (1953)
 Symphony of Love (1954)
 Appassionatamente (1954)
 The Courier of Moncenisio (1956)
 Love and Troubles (1958)
 The Love Specialist (1958)
 The Assassin (1961)

References

Bibliography
 Peter Brunette. Roberto Rossellini. University of California Press, 1996.

External links

Italian screenwriters
Italian film actresses